Charles Plamondon (born 4 May 1961) is a Canadian former biathlete who competed in the 1988 Winter Olympics.

References

1961 births
Living people
Canadian male biathletes
Olympic biathletes of Canada
Biathletes at the 1988 Winter Olympics